Chad D. Hays is a Republican member of the Illinois House of Representatives, representing the 104th district from December 2010 to September 7, 2018.

William B. Black resigned from the Illinois House effective December 22, 2010. The Republican county party chairs of the district appointed Hays to succeed Black. Hays was sworn into office on December 22, 2010. For the 96th General Assembly, House Minority Leader Tom Cross appointed Hays to the following committees: Appropriations-Higher Education; Financial Institutions; Railroad Industry; and Transportation, Regulation, Roads.

On July 7, 2017, Hays announced his retirement from the Illinois House citing the budget impasse and on June 22, 2018, gave an effective date of resignation of September 7, 2018.

On February 12, 2016, he was named as an Illinois state co-chair of John Kasich's presidential campaign.

References

External links 
 Representative Chad Hays (R) 104th District at the Illinois General Assembly
By session: 98th, 97th, 96th
State Representative Chad Hays constituency site
 

,

Republican Party members of the Illinois House of Representatives
People from Vermilion County, Illinois
Southern Illinois University Carbondale alumni
1941 births
Living people
21st-century American politicians